Mate Delić (born 29 April 1993) is a former Croatian tennis player. He primarily played on the ITF Futures Tour and ATP Challenger Tour.
Delic has reached a career high singles ranking of world No. 150, achieved on 5 January 2015, as well as a career high doubles ranking of world No. 348, achieved on 18 October, 2013.
Delic has reached 18 career singles finals, posting a tally of 5 wins and 13 losses, which includes a 0–2 record in ATP Challenger Tour finals. Additionally, he has reached 13 career singles finals with a record of 7 wins and 6 losses all coming on the ITF Futures Tour.

Juniors
As a junior, Delic reached a career high combined singles and doubles ranking of world No. 19, which he achieved on December 31 2011. His best results in the junior grand slams were a semifinal finish at the 2011 French Open in singles where he lost to Dominic Thiem and a semifinal finish at the 2011 Australian Open in doubles, partnering Joris De Loore where they lost to Jiri Vesely and Filip Horansky.

Professional career
In July 2011, Delic made his ATP Tour debut when he was granted a wildcard entry into the main draw of the 2011 Croatian Open. He would go on the lose to Italian Gianluca Naso in straight sets 4–6, 2–6. In 2014 he was given a wildcard into the main draw of the 2014 Zagreb Indoors where again he was defeated in the first round, this time by compatriot and fifth seed Marin Cilic 4–6, 4–6. Three months later at the 2014 Düsseldorf Open he qualified for a main draw for the first time in his career, and then went on to defeat Michał Przysiężny in the first round 7–5, 7–5, as well as Dustin Brown in the second round 6–3, 6–0, before eventually falling in the quarterfinals to Philipp Kohlschreiber in three sets 5–7, 6–4, 1–6. His only other win at the ATP Tour level was in a singles tie of Davis Cup play, where he represents his native Croatia.

Coaching
In 2022, he started coaching fellow Croatian Borna Coric.

ATP Challenger and ITF Futures finals

Singles: 18 (5–13)

Doubles: 13 (7–6)

References

External links

1993 births
Living people
Croatian male tennis players
Tennis players from Split, Croatia